Ľubomír Šatka (born 2 December 1995) is a Slovak professional footballer who plays as a centre-back for Ekstraklasa club Lech Poznań and the Slovakia national team.

Club career

Early career
Šatka was born in Ilava, Trenčín Region. A product of Dubnica, he joined Newcastle United in 2012. In 2014, he was included in the senior squad for a friendly tournament to be held in New Zealand. On 3 January 2015, Šatka made his first-team debut in an FA Cup match against Leicester City, which his team lost.

Šatka joined League Two club York City on 29 January 2016 on a one-month youth loan, and made his debut on 6 February as a 58th-minute substitute for Matty Dixon in a 2–0 away defeat to Northampton Town.

Dunajská Streda
Šatka returned to Slovakia to join Dunajská Streda on 10 January 2017 on a six-month loan deal. Satka left Newcastle when his contract expired at the end of the 2016–17 season.

Šatka signed a three-year contract with Dunajská Streda on 18 June 2017.

Lech Poznań
Šatka agreed to sign for Ekstraklasa club Lech Poznań on 29 June 2019 on a four-year contract, only joining the club in mid July after Dunajská Streda's tie in the 2019–20 UEFA Europa League first qualifying round.

International career
Šatka has been capped by Slovakia at under-17, under-18, under-19 and under-21 levels.

Šatka was listed as an alternate in the senior team for the two qualifying matches against Slovenia and England on 1 September 2017. In March 2018, he was called up to the senior team for the first time for two fixtures at the 2018 King's Cup. Although an unused substitute for the 2–1 victory over the United Arab Emirates, he debuted and played the entire final match on 25 March 2018 against Thailand in a 3–2 win.

Career statistics

Club

International
.

Honours

Lech Poznań
 Ekstraklasa: 2021–22

References

External links

Profile at the Lech Poznań website

1995 births
Living people
People from Ilava
Sportspeople from the Trenčín Region
Slovak footballers
Slovakia youth international footballers
Slovakia under-21 international footballers
Slovakia international footballers
Association football defenders
Newcastle United F.C. players
York City F.C. players
FC DAC 1904 Dunajská Streda players
Lech Poznań players
Lech Poznań II players
English Football League players
Slovak Super Liga players
Ekstraklasa players
II liga players
UEFA Euro 2020 players
Slovak expatriate footballers
Expatriate footballers in England
Expatriate footballers in Poland
Slovak expatriate sportspeople in England
Slovak expatriate sportspeople in Poland